, formerly , is a publisher founded in 1886 in Japan and headquartered in Sendagaya, Shibuya, Tokyo. It publishes the magazine Bungei and administers the Bungei Prize.

History 
Kawade Shobō Shinsha traces its history to 1886 when a new branch of the  bookstore in Gifu Prefecture was opened by Seiichirō Kawade (1857–1936) in Nihonbashi, Tokyo. In 1888, it became independent and published primarily textbooks and reference books in the fields of mathematics, physics, geography and agriculture.

It primarily published literary and arts books, as well as books on philosophy and various schools of thought. In 1945, Kawade Shobō was damaged during the Bombing of Tokyo and moved to Kanda-Ogawamachi in Chiyoda, Tokyo. In July 1949, Kawade Shobō published Yukio Mishima's breakout second novel Confessions of a Mask.

In 1957, Kawade Shobō went bankrupt. Publication of Bungei was suspended. A new company named Kawade Shobō Shinsha was established on 2 May 1957. In 1962, Kawade Shobō Shinsha relaunched the Bungei magazine and established the Bungei Prize, which is awarded to new authors. It was first awarded to Kazumi Takahashi's 1962 novel . Many of the Prize's winners became major bestsellers, including Yasuo Tanaka's 1981 novel Somehow, Crystal, and Akemi Hotta's 1981 novel .

In 1965, Takao Kawade died and his son Tomohisa Kawade became the company's third president. In 1968, the company went bankrupt once again. Takayuki Nakajima took over the company's leadership. In 1977, the company moved to Sumiyoshi-chō, Shinjuku and Masaru Shimizu assumed leadership of the company. In 1979, it moved Sendagaya, Shibuya.

In 1983, Kawade Shobō Shinsha published Jūrō Kara's novel , which was awarded the prestigious Akutagawa Prize and became a major bestseller and sensation in Japan. In 1987, Kawade Shobō Shinsha published Machi Tawara's debut collection of tanka poems, . It also published Tawara's collections Kaze no Tenohira (1991) and Chocolate Revolution (1997). Salad Anniversary was a major bestseller, selling 2.8 million copies. In the 1990s, Masaya Nakahara and Shū Fujisawa and other writers published their debut works through Kawade Shobō Shinsha. At the end of the 1990s, there was a boom of young writers centered around Bungei. In 1998, Kawade Shobō Shinsha coined the term , a genre of easily consumable contemporary Japanese literature for the average young city dweller.

In 2002, Shigeo Wakamori became president of Kawade Shobō Shinsha.

In January 2004, Risa Wataya was awarded the 130th Akutagawa Prize for her novel . At age 19, she became the award's youngest winner. The novel was published in hardcover by Kawade Shobō Shinsha in August 2003. Within two months of winning the Akutagawa Prize, the novel sold over one million copies.

In 2011, Yū Onodera was appointed president of Kawade Shobō Shinsha.

In 2014, four young employees of Kawade Shobō Shinsha voiced concerns over the significant increase in sales of books and magazines in Japan which feature an Anti-Chinese sentiment and Anti-Korean sentiment. Kawade Shobō Shinsha organized an in-store fair to sell objective publications about Japanese social issues, titled . The selection was conducted in collaboration with writers and critics, including Eiji Oguma, Toshiki Okada, Kazuhiro Soda, Kyoko Nakajima, Keiichiro Hirano, Tomoyuki Hoshino and Tatsuya Mori. A total of 18 books were selected, including 6 books published by Kawade Shobō Shinsha and 12 books published by other companies. This included books focused on China and South Korea, but also books about consumption tax, public assistance, modern history, constitutional law, and religion. Over 100 bookstores in Japan participated in the fair.

Publications

Magazine 
 Bungei

Book series

References

External links 

 Kawade Shobō Shinsha 

Book publishing companies in Tokyo
Comic book publishing companies in Tokyo
Magazine publishing companies in Tokyo
Publishing companies established in 1886
Japanese companies established in 1886